The fourth season  of the Australian Dancing with the Stars TV series premiered on Tuesday 21 February 2006 and concluded on Tuesday 9 May 2006.

Grant Denyer and his partner Amanda Garner won the series, with Kostya Tszyu and his partner Luda Kroitor as runner-up.

Couples
The following celebrities competed.

Scoring chart
Red numbers indicate the couples with the lowest score for each week.
Green numbers indicate the couples with the highest score for each week.
 indicates the couple (or couples) eliminated that week.
 indicates the returning couple that finished in the bottom two.
 indicates the winning couple.
 indicates the runner-up couple.
 indicates the third-place couple.

Averages 
This table only counts for dances scored on a traditional 40-points scale.

Highest and lowest scoring performances
The best and worst performances in each dance according to the judges' 40-point scale are as follows (guest judges scores are excluded):

Couples' highest and lowest scoring dances
Scores are based upon a 40-point maximum:

Running Order 
Individual judges scores in the chart below (given in parentheses) are listed in this order from left to right: Todd McKenney, Helen Richey, Paul Mercurio, Mark Wilson.

Week 1 

Running order

Week 2
Musical guests: Westlife
Running order

Week 3
Musical guests: 
Running order

Week 4
Musical guests: 
Running order

Week 5
Musical guests: Olivia Newton-John
Running order

Week 6
Musical guests:
Running order

Week 7
Musical guests: Shannon Noll
Running order

Week 8
Musical guests: Mark Sholtez
Running order

Week 9
Musical guests: The Veronicas
Running order

Week 10
Musical guests: Alex Lloyd, The Young Divas
Running order

Dance schedule
The celebrities and professional partners will dance one of these routines for each corresponding week.

Week 1 : Cha-cha-cha or Waltz
Week 2 : Quickstep or Rumba
Week 3 : Jive or Tango
Week 4 : Foxtrot or Paso doble
Week 5 : Samba
Week 6 : One unlearned Ballroom or Latin dance from weeks 1–5
Week 7 : One unlearned Ballroom or Latin dance from weeks 1–6
Week 8 : Two unlearned Ballroom or Latin dances from weeks 1–7
Week 9 : Final unlearned Ballroom or Latin dance from weeks 1–8 & Group American Smooth
Week 10 : Two Favourite Dances of the Season & Freestyle
When couples made it to Week 6, they would eventually have to perform a Viennese Waltz.

Dance chart

 Highest scoring dance
 Lowest scoring dance

References

Season 04
2006 Australian television seasons